Jung Tae-woo (정태우) is a South Korean actor. Much of his work has been in the genre of Korean historical dramas such as Taejo Wang Geon, Dae Jo Yeong, and The King and I.

Career 
Like many South Korean actors Jung, Tae-woo began his career as a child model/actor. He made his first mark in Korean TV drama at age 19 when he was awarded the 2001 KBS Best Supporting Actor award for his role as a precocious court advisor in the 200-episode historical series Taejo Wang Geon. He has been cast in a variety of supporting roles, from sensitive and tragic in historical drama to comic in such Korean television series as Nonstop, Into the Sun, and Mom's Dead Upset (aka Angry Mom).

In 2007 he appeared in the long-running and popular KBS historical series Dae Jo Yeong playing the hero's illegitimate son Geom. Immediately after, he made a brief but notable appearance in the SBS sageuk drama The King and I" playing the notorious Joseon king Yeonsangun.

His most notable movie role is as the pachinko game promoter Chun-bae in the 2004 martial arts film Fighter in the Wind.

In 2010, Jung portrayed a soldier in a series about the Korean War, Legend of the Patriots.

In January 2013, Jung co-starred in military musical The Promise. It was co-produced by the Ministry of National Defense and Korea Musical Theatre Association, to commemorate the 60th anniversary of the signing of an armistice. It ran from January 9 to 20 at the National Theater of Korea, co-starring actors Ji Hyun-woo, Kim Mu-yeol; as well as singers Leeteuk of Super Junior, Yoon Hak of Supernova, and Lee Hyun of 8Eight. The musical is centered around a group of soldiers who keeps a promise made to each other during the 6.25 war.

Personal life 
On May 8, 2009, Jung Tae-woo wed stewardess Jang In-hee in a private Christian ceremony at Seoul's Shilla Hotel. They have two sons, born in 2010 and 2015.

Filmography

TV series 
 Taejong Yi Bang-won (KBS1, 2021–2022)
 My Sibling's Lovers: Family Is Watching (E Channel, 2019)
 Criminal Minds (tvN, 2017) - Kim Min Soo
 The Merchant: Gaekju 2015 (KBS, 2015)
 The Jingbirok: A Memoir of Imjin War (KBS, 2015)
 Gwanggaeto, The Great Conqueror (KBS, 2011)
 Legend of the Patriots (KBS, 2010)
 Mom's Dead Upset (KBS, 2008)
 The King and I (SBS, 2008) -  Prince Yeonsan
 Dae Jo Yeong (KBS, 2007) - Dae Geom
 Police Line (On Media cable, 2007)
 Great Inheritance (KBS, 2006)
 Age of Warriors (KBS, 2003) - Emperor Huijong
 Into the Sun (SBS, 2003) - Kim Jae-hyun
 Nonstop 3 (MBC, 2003)
 King's Woman (SBS, 2003) - Prince Gwanghae's Prince Successor
 Woman of the World (SBS, 2002) - King Injong
 Taejo Wang Geon (KBS, 2000) - Choi Ung
 Nonstop (TV Sitcom, 2000)
 The King and Queen (KBS, 1998) - King Danjong
 Tears of the Dragon (1996) - Great Prince Muan
 Han Myeong-hoi (KBS, 1994) - King Danjong
 The Ume Tree in the Midst of the Snow (Episode 3 of "The 500 Years of the Joseon Dynasty"; MBC, 1984–1985) - King Danjong

Films 
 I'm Here (TBA)
 Oh! My Ghost (2022) 
 Wedding Campaign (2005)
 Fighter in the Wind (2004)
 Chihwaseon (aka Painted Fire or Strokes of Fire) (2002)
 Kid Cop (1993)

Web series 
 Now, Parliament is 36.5 (2022) as Nam Goong-hoon

Television shows 
 Mr. House Husband 2 (2022–present) - Cast Member

Theater 
 2009/2010 Equus
 2009 Jazz Lunatic

Awards
KBS Best Supporting Actor (2001)
 2022: 2022 KBS Entertainment Awards -  Rookie Award in Reality Category	(Mr. House Husband 2)

References

External links 
 Cyworld homepage
 Yahoo! Korea
 KPopVideo
 cafe.daum.net/cbetataewoo

1982 births
South Korean male television actors
Mystic Entertainment artists
Living people
South Korean male film actors